The Symphony No. 10 in D major, Hoboken I/10, is a symphony by Joseph Haydn. The symphony may have been written as early as 1757 but no later than 1761, probably for the small, but resourceful orchestra of Count Morzin.

It is scored for 2 oboes, bassoon, 2 horns, strings and continuo. The work is in three movements:

 Allegro, 
 Andante, G major, 
 Presto,

References 

Symphony 010
Compositions in D major